Lars Borgersrud (born 11 March 1949) is a Norwegian military historian and government scholar. His work has largely centered on World War II in Norway.

Borgersrud formed close relations with leading figures of the Norwegian Maoist movement beginning in the late 1960s.

Career
Borgersrud's master's thesis from 1975 disclosed sensitive information regarding military personnel and organization prior to World War II and their possible effects on military preparedness prior to the invasion of Norway by Nazi Germany. As a student he was threatened with being prosecuted if he published his thesis. Nevertheless, Borgersrud eventually published three books with material from his work under the pseudonym "Ottar Strømme": Stille mobilisering, Unngå å irritere fienden and Den hemmelige hæren. In 1978, he also published the first volume of the secret report from Den militære undersøkelseskommisjonen av 1946, under the same pseudonym.

He was a contributor to the 1995 World War II encyclopedia Norsk krigsleksikon 1940-1945.

Research
His 1995 doctoral dissertation examined the Wollweber organization in Norway.

In the 2000s, he also participated in research on the fate of war children—children born during the German occupation of Norway who had German fathers and Norwegian mothers.

Denied access to governmental archive
While preparing the book Konspirasjon og kapitulasjon (2000), Borgersrud tried to survey Norwegian military officers with Nazi sympathies but met resistance and was denied access to historical documents from the National Archival Services of Norway.

Family
He was until 1982 married to professor and feminism activist Leikny Øgrim, daughter of XU member and physicist Otto Øgrim and sister of SUF(m-l) and AKP(m-l) ideologist Tron Øgrim. He is the father of rappers Elling and Aslak from Gatas Parlament.

References

Selected works

1949 births
Living people
20th-century Norwegian historians
University of Oslo alumni
Academic staff of the University of Oslo
Norwegian military historians
Historians of World War II
Place of birth missing (living people)
21st-century Norwegian historians